Dillaway is a surname. Notable people with the surname include:

 Aaron Dillaway (born 1971), Australian politician
 Don Dillaway (1903–1982), American actor
 Robert Beacham Dillaway (1924–2015), American aeronautical engineer

See also
 Dallaway, surname
 Dillaway School
 Dilloway, surname